Rock 'n' Roll is a 1959 Australian film directed by Lee Robinson. While often referred to as a documentary, it is essentially a complete filming of a rock concert held in October 1959, at Sydney Stadium. The film was commissioned by Lee Gordon to promote a string of 1959 shows entitled Lee Gordon's 1959 Rock'n'Roll Spectacular, mainly showcasing Australian and New Zealand artists. While the show was largely based around native talent, the headline act was the American singer and pop idol Fabian. 

Up until 2020 Rock 'n' Roll was classified as a lost film by the NFSA and rested in their 'most wanted' list for a number of years. Its recent discovery is arguably the most important Australian cultural artefact recovered in the last 50 years, due in no small part to the fact that Rock 'n' Roll was the only 35mm feature-length film of a live Rock 'n' Roll concert ever made in the 1950s. Moreover, it is arguably the only piece of 35mm Rock 'n' Roll live footage from the 1950s in existence, since The Pied Piper of Cleveland (the only other 35mm live film shot in this decade) is considered to be lost by many researchers.

The first showing of Rock 'n' Roll was in Newcastle, NSW in December 1959 and after very limited showings in Melbourne and Sydney, the film disappeared from the public eye. Apart from a stint in New Zealand, it was not shown in any other country. 

Besides small sections of the film with no audio attached, The O'Keefe performance of "Shout" was thought to be the only surviving piece of the films footage until recently. This performance in the film has been used in the opening credits of ABC Australia's music show Rage since 1987.

In March 2020, 60 years since its premiere in Newcastle, the film surfaced in Melbourne, Australia. It is reported to be in excellent condition for its age, with the image quality far surpassing any existing footage of this era. This was in no small part due to the equipment used for the filming, and that the film was shot on 35mm safety film.

Rock 'n' Roll is a unique and priceless piece of Australiana and Rock 'n' Roll history. Having been filmed by arguably Australia's most important pioneering director, Lee Robinson, it is also, just as importantly, a treasured record of Australia's cinematic past. The film's worth is also enhanced by the fact that the sound and camera technology used for its filming was ahead of its time. 7 cameras were used to film the wild scenes that evening at the Sydney Stadium, capturing the essence of the Australian/International Rock 'n' Roll scene in the 1950s like no other.

In early 2021, a short clip from the documentary was posted onto YouTube, featuring Johnny O'Keefe performing "Swanee River". Follow this link.

The film screened at ACMI, Melbourne for the first time in over 50 years on 6 December 2021.

Featured acts
The Rebels – without Johnny Rebb
The Delltones – backed by The Rebels
Fabian – backed by The Graduates
Lee Gordon
Col Joye and the Joy Boys
Johnny Devlin and the Devils
Lonnie Lee
Johnny O'Keefe and the DJs
Warren Williams
The Delltones
The Crescents
The Graduates with Nancy Eichorn

References

External links
 
Rock'n'Roll at National Film and Sound Archive

1959 films
Australian documentary films
1959 documentary films
Films directed by Lee Robinson
Concert films
1950s English-language films